General Sir Henry Crichton Sclater,  (5 November 1855 – 26 September 1923) was a British Army General during World War I.

Military career
Henry Crichton Sclater, the third son of James Henry Sclater and Louisa Catherine Fowler, was born on 5 November 1855. After being educated at Cheltenham, he went to the Royal Military Academy and was commissioned in the Royal Artillery in 1875. 

Sclater was a General Staff Officer and later Deputy Assistant Adjutant General at the Headquarters for the Nile expedition between 1884 and 1885. He was promoted to Major on 15 June 1885, served in the Egyptian Frontier Field Force from 1885 to 1886 and was Deputy Assistant Adjutant General in Cairo from 1885 to 1890. Following his return to the United Kingdom, he was Brigade major of Royal Artillery, until in late 1899 he was reassigned following the outbreak of the Second Boer War.

He served as Assistant Adjutant General, Royal Artillery and Colonel on the General Staff of the Royal Artillery in South Africa (mentioned in despatches dated 31 March 1900). Following the end of the war, Lord Kitchener (Commander-in-Chief in South Africa) wrote in a despatch dated June 1902 how Sclater "possesses an unusual combination of ability and common sense. I consider him to be a Staff officer of exceptional value, to whom all ranks of the Royal Artillery in South Africa owe much." He returned home with the SS Kinfauns Castle leaving Cape Town in early August 1902, after the war had ended. In recognition of services during the war, he was appointed a Companion of the Order of the Bath (CB) in the South Africa honours list published on 26 June 1902, and he received the actual decoration from King Edward VII after his return, during an investiture at Buckingham Palace on 24 October 1902.

In September 1902, Sclater accompanied Lord Roberts, Commander-in-Chief of the Forces, and St John Brodrick, Secretary of State for War, on a visit to Germany to attend the German army maneuvers as guest of the Emperor Wilhelm. The following month, he was back as a regular regimental officer in the Royal Artillery, but in early November 1902 he was again appointed a staff officer as Deputy Director-General of Ordnance, with the substantive rank of colonel in the army. The Army Ordnance Department was responsible for supply of weapons and military equipment. He was Director of Artillery at the War Office from 1903 to 1904 when he became Quartermaster General for India. In 1908 he was appointed Commander of Quetta Division in India.

He served in World War I as Adjutant-General to the Forces and a Member of Army Council from 1914 to 1916: in this capacity he was responsible for the expansion of the Army in 1914. He served as General Officer Commanding-in-Chief for Southern Command from 1916 to 1919, and retired in 1922.

Family
On 12 June 1884 Sclater married Edith Barttelot. They had no children.

Death
Sclater died on 26 September 1923, and was survived by his wife, Dame Edith Sclater.

References

|-
 

|-
 

1855 births
1923 deaths
British Army generals
British Army generals of World War I
Knights Grand Cross of the Order of the Bath
Knights Grand Cross of the Order of the British Empire
Royal Artillery officers
British Army personnel of the Second Boer War
British Army personnel of the Mahdist War
Place of birth missing
Place of death missing